Dédée d'Anvers is a 1948 French drama film directed by Yves Allégret that stars Bernard Blier, Simone Signoret, and Marcel Dalio. The film was released in English-speaking markets under the titles Dedee and Woman of Antwerp.

Plot
Forced to leave France, Dédée and her bullying pimp Marco have reached Antwerp, where she is one of the girls in René's bar and Marco is the doorman, doing drug deals on the side. Taking a stroll by the docks in the early evening, Dédée meets Francesco, sympathetic Italian captain of a cargo ship, who knows René. When he comes later to the bar, he discusses some secret deal with René and then takes Dédée to a hotel for the night. 

The two have fallen for each other and he would like to take her away with him, but this would need the agreement of René and of Marco. René is happy to do a favour to Francesco, happy to free Dédée from the obnoxious Marco, who he throws out into the street, and says he is happy to drive Dédée to Francesco's ship once he has closed the bar for the night.

While Francesco is waiting on the jetty for Dédée to appear, Marco shoots him dead, drops his gun, and disappears. When René and Dédée arrive to find the body, they comb the nightspots of the city in search of Marco, eventually catching him at the railway station. At gunpoint they take him to a lonely spot where René, after knocking him out, runs the car over him.

Cast
 Bernard Blier as Monsier René
 Simone Signoret as Dédée
 Marcello Pagliero as Francesco
 Marcel Dalio as Marco
 Jane Marken as Germaine
 Marcel Dieudonné as smuggler
 Marcelle Arnold as Magda

References

External links
 
 

1948 films
Films directed by Yves Allégret
French black-and-white films
French drama films
1948 drama films
Film noir
1940s French films